Hamlet at Elsinore is a 1964 television version of the c. 1600 play by William Shakespeare. Produced by the BBC in association with Danish Radio, it was shown in the U.S. on NET. Winning wide acclaim both for its performances and for being shot entirely at Helsingør (Elsinore in English), in the castle in which the play is set, it is the only version (with sound) of the play to have actually been shot at Elsinore Castle. This programme was recorded and edited on video tape (2" quadruplex) and not 'filmed'. The director was Philip Saville. It was the longest version of the play telecast in one evening up to that time, running nearly three hours. A 1947 telecast of the play had split it up into two ninety-minute halves over two weeks.

The Canadian actor Christopher Plummer took the lead role as Hamlet and earned an Emmy Award nomination for his performance. In supporting roles were Robert Shaw as Claudius, Donald Sutherland as Fortinbras, Roy Kinnear as the Gravedigger and Michael Caine, in his only Shakespearean performance, as Horatio. Sutherland, Caine and Shaw were, at the time, almost completely unknown to American audiences, and just before the presentation's first U.S. telecast, Plummer began to gain popularity in the U.S. because of his appearance in the 1965 musical film The Sound of Music.

Clips of the programme are very rarely shown on television, and Plummer himself expressed a wish for it to be commercially available. It was released on Region 1 DVD by the BBC and Warner on 25 October 2011.

Cast 
 Christopher Plummer as Hamlet
 Robert Shaw as Claudius, King of Denmark
 Alec Clunes as Polonius
 Michael Caine as Horatio
 June Tobin as Gertrude, Queen of Denmark
 Jo Maxwell Muller as Ophelia
 Dyson Lovell as Laertes
 Donald Sutherland as Fortinbras
 Roy Kinnear as the Gravedigger

Horatio is, so far, the only classical role played by Michael Caine, who had never received dramatic training. According to his 2011 autobiography The Elephant to Hollywood, Caine had been released from his contract with producer Joseph E. Levine after the making of Zulu as Levine had told him, "I know you're not, but you gotta face the fact that you look like a queer on screen."

Caine wrote, "I decided that if my on-screen appearance was going to be an issue, then I would use it to bring out all Horatio's ambiguous sexuality."

Production 

The production was originated by Danish television, which lacked the financial resources to realize the project and turned to the BBC for help. Videotaped at Kronborg Castle in Elsinore, Denmark, in September 1963 by a Danish crew with the director and actors supplied by the BBC, it represents a technical milestone for the BBC as a full-length play had never been videotaped on-location before.

The producer, Peter Luke, deliberately cast lesser-known actors as it was felt using major stars would prove a distraction. Plummer, Shaw and particularly Caine would become stars within a year to two of the original broadcast, and Sutherland would become a star in 1970 after the release of the film MASH. Jo Maxwell Muller, who was only 18 years old, was cast as Ophelia on the insistence of Plummer.

Hamlet at Elsinore was broadcast in Canada on April 15, 1964, and in the United Kingdom on April 19, exactly one week before Shakespeare's 400th birthday. It was intended by the BBC to be its major commemoration of the Shakespeare quatercentenary. It was broadcast in the United States on November 15, 1964.

Awards 

At the 18th Emmy Awards (1966), Christopher Plummer was nominated in the category of Outstanding Single Performance by an Actor in a Leading Role in a Drama for his performance as Hamlet.

See also 

 Hamlet
 Hamlet on screen

References

External links 
 

1964 television plays
Films based on Hamlet
British television plays
Films directed by Philip Saville